Character.ai (stylized as Character.AI, also known as Character AI) is a neural language model chatbot web application that can generate human-like text responses and participate in the contextual conversation. Constructed by previous developers of Google's LaMDA, Noam Shazeer, and Daniel De Freitas, the beta model was made available to use by the public in September 2022.

Users can create "characters", craft their "personalities", set specific parameters, and then publish them to the community for others to chat with. Many characters may be based on fictional media sources or celebrities, while others are completely original, some being made with certain goals in mind such as assisting with creative writing or being a text-based adventure game. Users may connect with a singular character or organize group chats containing multiple characters conversing with each other and/or the user at once.

Generation 

When a character sends back a response, users can rate the response from 1 to 4 stars. In addition, users can give reasons on why a certain amount of stars are chosen by clicking on one of 4 to 6 buttons. The rating predominantly affects the specific character, but also affects the behavioral selection as a whole. The user can also click the right arrow for the AI to generate a new response, and later look through the generated messages by clicking on the left arrow.

Built from advanced deep learning and expansive language models, the software is currently in beta and continually undergoing improvement; on the 5th of November 2022, conversation memory was increased by double the previous capacity so that the AI would be able to "remember" messages from farther back.

Character "personalities" are designed via descriptions from the point of view of the character and its greeting message, and further molded from conversations made into examples, giving its messages a star rating and modification to fit the precise dialect and identity the user desires. 

Users may begin creating their bots by entering either quick or advanced character creation mode. In advanced creation, users may input short and long descriptions, as well as the "definition" or the example chats that give the AI a better understanding of the character's behavior. For inexperienced users, an official guide on how to perfect character creation, the Character Book, can be found on the website.

The website states that "Pornographic content is against our terms of service, and will not be supported at any point in the future.". This statement and its implementation has been met with backlash from its user base.

References

External links 
 
 
 
 Character Book
Deep learning software applications
Chatbots